The Family of Man is a song written in 1955 by Karl Dallas, under the name Fred Dallas. It was inspired by Dallas' visit to a touring photography exhibition, The Family of Man, when it visited the Royal Festival Hall in London.

It was recorded by The Spinners, with the Oxford Dictionary of National Biography 2005-2008 entry for the band's Cliff Hall saying:

It was also recorded by the London Youth Choir for their "Songs from Aldermaston" EP; by Bitter Withy, and by Colin Wilkie & Shirley Hart. The song has also been included in school song books and hymn books. A choral arrangement was made by the composer Alan Bush.

References 

1955 songs